The 1998 Spengler Cup was held in Davos, Switzerland from December 26 to December 31, 1998.  All matches were played at host HC Davos's home Eisstadion Davos. The final was won 5-2 by Team Canada over host HC Davos.

Teams participating
 Team Canada
 HC Davos (host)
 VEU Feldkirch
 Färjestad BK
 HC Petra Vsetín

Tournament

Round-Robin results

All times local (CET/UTC +1)

Finals

External links
Spenglercup.ch
hockeyarchives

1998-99
1998–99 in Swiss ice hockey
1998–99 in Czech ice hockey
1998–99 in Canadian ice hockey
1998–99 in Swedish ice hockey
December 1998 sports events in Europe